Kotla is a historic village in Nuh district of Haryana, India. Located 7 km south of Nuh city in the scenic Aravalli Hills, Kotla was a stronghold of the Khanzadas of Mewat and seat of power of the Khanzada ruler Bahadur Nahar Khan. Its historical importance came from its strategic position: in a narrow valley with only one pass, and protected on the east by the large Dahar lake, when the lake was filled with water, the only way in was through a narrow strip of land between the lake and the hills.

Kotla is listed in the Ain-i-Akbari as a pargana under the sarkar of Tijara, producing a revenue of 1,552,196 dams for the imperial treasury and supplying a force of 700 infantry and 30 cavalry. It appears with the note "Has a brick fort on a hill on which there is a reservoir 4 kos in circumference."

References 

Villages in Nuh district
Mewat
Forts in Haryana